Jeanne Darst is an American author. She is a regular contributor to This American Life and has written for The New York Times, The New York Times Magazine, and Vogue. Her memoir, Fiction Ruined My Family, was published in October 2011 by Riverhead Books.

Early life

The youngest of four girls, Darst was born in St. Louis, Missouri and moved to Stony Hill Farm in Amagansett, New York when she was 7 so her father, a newspaperman and writer for Harper's Magazine, The Nation, and The New York Times, could write his first novel. The family planned to return to Missouri after one year. The family did not move back to St. Louis, however, they moved to Bronxville, where Darst attended Bronxville High School. She received her B.A. at SUNY Purchase where she began to write and perform her plays.

On her father's side was a family of writers. Her grandmother, Katharine Darst, was a writer for the St. Louis Globe Democrat, with a daily column called "Here and There" and a Sunday column called "The Back Seat Driver". She also had a radio show on KMOX, a CBS affiliate, in the 1940s. Her grandfather, James Darst, was a reporter for the St. Louis Globe Democrat as well as director of Fox Movietone News. Darst's first cousin is Thomas French, Pulitzer Prize -winning journalist for the St. Petersburg Times.

Her great uncle was Joseph Darst, mayor of St. Louis from 1949–1953. Darst's mother, Doris Jeanne Gissy, was, at age 14, the youngest person to appear on the cover of Sports Illustrated. Gissy appeared on the magazine's cover in August 1956 for horse riding along with her sister Ruth Gissy.

Writing career
Her memoir, Fiction Ruined My Family, was published in October 2011 by Riverhead Books. It was excerpted in the October 2011 issue of Vogue. Fiction Ruined My Family is Darst's memoir growing up in a literary family and battling an alcohol addiction. Janet Maslin of the New York Times called it "a winningly snarky memoir" and The New Yorker called it "darkly comic" and "highly entertaining."

Darst wrote and produced a pilot of Fiction Ruined My Family for HBO. She has written for television since 2015. Her play, Je Regrette Tout!, based on the life of her mother and Edith Piaf, was produced by Phantom Theater in Vermont. In 2018 Darst adapted JAWS for the stage and recruited her family to be in it in Phantom Theater's barn in Warren, Vermont.

References

External links
Jeanne Darst on This American Life
New York Times Magazine essay
San Francisco Chronicle book review
Chicago Tribune book review
Boston Globe book review

Living people
Writers from St. Louis
People from Amagansett, New York
People from Bronxville, New York
Year of birth missing (living people)